Andrew Barton Reid (born February 26, 1954) is a former American football running back who played one game for the Buffalo Bills of the NFL. He went to college at Georgia and had 160 rushes for 837 yards and five touchdowns.

References

1954 births
Living people
American football running backs
Georgia Bulldogs football players
Buffalo Bills players
Players of American football from Ohio
Sportspeople from Hamilton, Ohio